The Central Zambezian miombo woodlands ecoregion spans southern central Africa. Miombo woodland is the predominant plant community. It is one of the largest ecoregions on the continent, and home to a great variety of wildlife, including many large mammals.

Location and description
The region covers a large area stretching northeast from Angola, including the southeast section of the Democratic Republic of the Congo, the northern half of Zambia, a large section of western Tanzania, southern Burundi, and northern and western Malawi. In the Congo the ecoregion is almost conterminous with Katanga Province. In Zambia it covers the northern half of the country above Lusaka, including the eastern and western "ears" and the Copperbelt. In Tanzania it covers the western inland provinces between Lake Victoria, Lake Tanganyika and Lake Malawi.

The area is mostly flat plateau, and the soils are poor. There is a tropical climate with a long dry season, up to seven months, which leaves the forest vulnerable to fires, and a rainy season from November to March. The woodland is interspersed with riverside dambos (grassy wetlands), which may constitute up to thirty percent of the region.

Flora
The woodlands contain much typical miombo flora of high trees with shrub and grassland underneath, but has much other plant life too. There are typically more evergreen trees than in most miombo woodlands. The classic miombo trees Brachystegia, Julbernardia, and Isoberlinia dominate the woodlands with other tree species such as Pterocarpus angolensis, Albizia sp. and Afzelia quanzensis. Under the trees lie important areas of plants such as the herbaceous Crotalaria and Indigofera.

Fauna
The fauna is diverse. The grasses, shrubs and trees sustain many large mammals including black rhino, Cape buffalo, African elephants, and antelopes such as elands, sable antelope, roan antelope,  Lichtenstein's hartebeest, and sitatunga. Large carnivores include lion (Panthera leo), leopard (Panthera pardus), cheetah (Acinonyx jubatus), spotted hyena (Crocuta crocuta), striped hyena (Hyaena hyaena), African wild dog (Lycaon pictus) and side-striped jackal (Canis adustus). There are also many primates in the woodlands, particularly in Uganda and the Democratic Republic of the Congo, including yellow baboon and chimpanzee. The Gombe Stream National Park chimpanzee reserve is in this ecoregion. The only endemic mammals are Monard's dormouse (Graphiurus monardi), Rosevear's lemniscomys (Lemniscomys roseveari), Ansell's shrew (Crocidura ansellorum) and Upemba shrew (Crocidura zimmeri).

The woodlands are also home to many reptiles and birds. There are two endemic bird species, both found in the area of the ecoregion within the Democratic Republic of the Congo: the Lake Lufira weaver (Ploceus ruweti) and the black-lored waxbill (Estrilda nigriloris).

There are nineteen endemic reptiles and thirteen endemic amphibians; a particularly rich area for these is Upemba National Park.

Urban areas and settlements
Although the ecoregion does include large areas of wilderness and national parkland, there are also areas with quite heavy population densities, particularly in Malawi and Burundi and in densely populated urban areas such as Lusaka in Zambia, around which the forest has been largely cleared for planting, firewood and charcoal production. Most of Zambia north of Lusaka is in this ecoregion, including the Copperbelt cities of Ndola, Kitwe, Chingola, location of the huge Nchanga Mines, Luanshya, and the Central Province former mining town of Kabwe (Broken Hill). In Congo, Katanga has a copper and cobalt mining industry, and there is a railway line north through the province from the capital Lubumbashi. In Tanzania the Lake Tanganyika port of Kigoma is the starting point for a visit to Gombe Stream National Park.

Threats and preservation
Threats to the area include bushmeat hunting, in particular the poaching of elephant and rhino. Fire is damaging throughout the region and where there are human populations fire is more common, including the burning of woodland to create agricultural land or for charcoal, for example in Central Zambia. In the highly urbanised Copperbelt areas of Zambia and the Congo the forest has been extensively cleared for charcoal and farming, and waterways polluted by the mining industry, while the civil war in the Congo has led to considerable damage to the environment there.

Protected areas
26.5% of the ecoregion is in protected areas. These include large areas of national park, game reserve, and other protected areas.

Angola
 Cameia National Park

Burundi
 Bururi Forest Nature Reserve
 Kigwena Forest Nature Reserve
 Ruvubu National Park

Democratic Republic of the Congo
 Kundelungu National Park
 Lake Tshangalele Nature Reserve
 Lufira Biosphere Reserve
 Upemba National Park

Malawi
 Nyika National Park
 Kasungu National Park
 Nkhotakota Wildlife Reserve
 Vwaza Marsh Wildlife Reserve

Tanzania
 Gombe Stream National Park
 Katavi National Park
 Mahale Mountains National Park
 Ruaha National Park
 Rubondo Island National Park

Zambia
 Kafue National Park in western Zambia,
 Isangano National Park, Lavushi Manda National Park, and privately-managed Kasanka National Park in central Zambia
 Chembe Bird Sanctuary in the Copperbelt
 Mweru Wantipa National Park, Lusenga Plain National Park, and Nsumbu National Park in northern Zambia.
 Nyika National Park
 North Luangwa National Park
 South Luangwa National Park
 West Lunga National Park

See also
Ecoregions of Zambia

References

External links
Wildworld photo
Development of a MIOMBO woodland dynamics model in Zambezian Africa Using Malawi as a case study
Opportunities and challenges for sustainable management of miombo woodlands: the Zambian perspective

 
.
Afrotropical ecoregions
Ecoregions of Africa
Ecoregions of Angola
Ecoregions of Burundi
Ecoregions of the Democratic Republic of the Congo
Ecoregions of Malawi
Ecoregions of Tanzania
Ecoregions of Zambia

Forests of Angola
Forests of Burundi
Forests of the Democratic Republic of the Congo
Forests of Malawi
Forests of Tanzania
Forests of Zambia
Grasslands of Africa
Tropical and subtropical grasslands, savannas, and shrublands
Zambezian region